Windows and Walls is the eighth album by American singer-songwriter Dan Fogelberg, released in 1984 (see 1984 in music). The first single, "The Language of Love", reached No. 13 on the U.S. Billboard Hot 100 chart, making it his last Top 40 hit. Although the follow-up, "Believe in Me", missed the Top 40 of the pop chart, peaking at No. 48, it became the singer's fourth No. 1 song on the Billboard adult contemporary chart.

Track listing
All songs written by Dan Fogelberg
"The Language of Love" – 3:43
"Windows and Walls" – 4:56
"The Loving Cup" – 5:00
"Tucson, Arizona (Gazette)" – 8:36
"Let Her Go" – 4:58
"Sweet Magnolia (And the Traveling Salesman)" – 4:41
"Believe in Me" – 4:36
"Gone Too Far" – 4:31

Personnel 
 Dan Fogelberg – lead and backing vocals, acoustic guitar (1, 2, 3, 7), electric lead guitar (1, 3, 4, 5, 8), rhythm guitar (1, 3, 5, 8), percussion (1), acoustic piano (2, 6, 8), electric guitar (2), bass (2, 4, 6, 7), string arrangements (2), lead guitar (4), classical guitar (4), Roland Jupiter 8 (4), tambourine (5), electric piano (6), high-string guitar (7)
 Michael Hanna – acoustic piano (1, 3, 4, 5, 7), organ (1), keyboards (2), Prophet-5 (2), Roland Jupiter 8 (2, 3, 4, 8), chimes (2), string arrangements (2, 4, 6), electric piano (3, 5, 8)
 Gary Burden – pedal steel guitar (4)
 Dave Falkenberry – lap steel guitar (4), dobro (4)
 Kenny Passarelli – bass (1, 3)
 Charlie Fernandez – acoustic bass (4)
 Norbert Putnam – bass (5)
 Mike Porcaro – bass (8)
 Joe Vitale – drums (1, 3)
 Russ Kunkel – drums (4, 5, 6), castanets (4), congas (4), tape loop (4)
 Jeff Porcaro – drums (8), tambourine (8)
 Joe Lala – cowbell (1), tambourine (1), congas (4), triangle (4)
 Katharine Burden – cello (4), violin (4)
 Tom Scott – clarinet (6)
 Glen Spreen – string arrangements (7)
 Sid Sharp – concertmaster (2, 4, 6, 8)
 Timothy B. Schmit – harmony vocals (1), backing vocals (6)
 Max Gronenthal – backing vocals (3)

Production
 Producers – Dan Fogelberg and Marty Lewis
 Engineer – Marty Lewis
 Recorded at Caribou Ranch (Nederland, CO); Longview Farm (Brookfield, MA); Sunset Sound (Hollywood, CA); The Plant (Sausalito, CA).
 Mastered by George Marino at Sterling Sound (New York, NY).
 Design – Kosh and Ron Larson
 Cover Photography – Marc Allen 
 Sleeve Photography – Andy Katz

Charts
Album – Billboard (United States)

Singles – Billboard (United States)

References

Dan Fogelberg albums
1984 albums
Epic Records albums